Northern Farm: A Chronicle of Maine is a 1948 book by naturalist/writer Henry Beston. Originally written for The Progressive as a series of columns on country-living, it chronicles a season on a small Maine farm. Beston is also the author of The Outermost House. Northern Farm has been less commercially successful but still important as environmental writing and popular among Mainers.

Annie Dillard's journal entry
The Pulitzer Prize winner Annie Dillard made a journal entry concerning Northern Farm:

References

External links
 Author web site

1948 non-fiction books
American autobiographies
Maine culture